Paracarinachitids are a group of small shelly fossils that may be related to the cambroclaves. They resemble small limpets with a large spine on their pinnacle; they have concentric growth rings resulting from incremental growth.

See also
List of small shelly fossil taxa

References

Fossil record of animals
Enigmatic animal taxa